The 2006 IBAF Women's Baseball World Cup was held from July 31 to August 6 in Taipei, Taiwan and won by the United States.

Final results

All-Stars Team

See also
 List of sporting events in Taiwan

External links 
 Results at Sports123.com

2006
Women's Baseball World Cup
2000s in women's baseball
2006 in baseball
Women's Baseball World Cup, 2006
Sports competitions in Taipei
Women's Baseball World Cup
Women's Baseball World Cup
2000s in Taipei